Khenifiss National Park is a national park in the southwest of Morocco, located near Akhfenir on the Atlantic coast in the region of Laâyoune-Sakia El Hamra. It was established in 2006. The national park was created to protect desert, wetlands, and coastal dunes.

The park was first created as a natural reserve in 1960, and in 1980, it was classified as a wetland of international importance. In 1983, the natural reserve was transformed into a Permanent Biological Reserve, and on September 26, 2006, the national park was created.

The park is located at the coast of Atlantic Ocean, north of the border with Western Sahara, between the towns of Tan-Tan (north) and Tarfaya (south). The National Route 1, which runs along the Atlantic coast of Morocco, passes through the park.

The park includes a coastal portion, the Khenfiss lagoon, the biggest lagoon at the Moroccan coast, and the inland portion, located on desert plateaus. The lagoon is also an important bird nesting ground. Ruddy shelduck, marbled duck, and Audouin's gull inhabit the lagoon permanently, and a big number of species migrate here in winter. Every year, about 20,000 birds stay in the lagoon area in the winter season.

The inland part includes sabkhas and is typical for Sahara landscapes. It also includes sand dunes and limestone plateaus.

The government declared its intention to turn the park into a major tourist attraction specializing in ecotourism.

World Heritage Status
This site was added to the UNESCO World Heritage Tentative List on 12/10/1998 in the natural category.

References

External links
 

National parks of Morocco
Ramsar sites in Morocco
Protected areas established in 2006
Geography of Laâyoune-Sakia El Hamra